Moses Nyondo (born 5 July 1997) is a Zambian footballer who plays as a defender for Nkana and the Zambia national football team.

References

External links

1997 births
Living people
Nkana F.C. players
Zambian footballers
Zambia international footballers
Association football defenders
2019 Africa U-23 Cup of Nations players
Zambia under-20 international footballers